The 2003 Women's World Water Polo Championship was the sixth edition of the women's water polo tournament at the World Aquatics Championships, organised by the world governing body in aquatics, the FINA. The tournament was held from 13 to 25 July 2003, and was incorporated into the 2003 World Aquatics Championships in Barcelona, Spain.

Hungary, United States, Canada, Russia and Italy qualified for this event by finishing in the top five at the 2002 FINA World Cup in Perth, Australia.

Teams

Group A
 
 
 
 

Group B
 
 
 
 

Group C
 
 
 
 

Group D

Squads

Preliminary round

Group A

 July 13, 2003

 July 15, 2003

 July 17, 2003

Group B

 July 13, 2003

 July 15, 2003

 July 17, 2003

Group C

 July 13, 2003

 July 15, 2003

 July 17, 2003

Group D

 July 13, 2003

 July 15, 2003

 July 17, 2003

Play-offs
 July 19, 2003

Final round

Quarterfinals
 July 21, 2003

Semifinals
 July 19, 2003 — 13th/16th place

 July 21, 2003 — 9th/12th place

 July 23, 2003 — 5th/8th place

 July 23, 2003 — 1st/4th place

Finals
 July 21, 2003 — 15th place

 July 21, 2003 — 13th place

 July 23, 2003 — 11th place

 July 23, 2003 — 9th place

 July 25, 2003 — 7th place

 July 25, 2003 — 5th place

 July 25, 2003 — Bronze Medal Match

 July 25, 2003 — Gold Medal Match

Final ranking

Medalists

References

 SwimNews Results

Women
2003
2003 in women's water polo
Women's water polo in Spain
2003 in Spanish women's sport